Katharine Jane Hudson (born 1958) is a British left-wing political activist and academic who is the General Secretary of the Campaign for Nuclear Disarmament (CND) and Media Officer of Left Unity. She served as Chair of CND from 2003 to 2010 and has been an officer of the Stop the War Coalition since 2002.

Life and career
She was Head of Social and Policy Studies at London South Bank University from September 2003 to 2010 and is now a Visiting Research Fellow. She was founding editor of the journal Contemporary Politics, serves on the editorial board of Debatte: Journal of Contemporary Central and Eastern Europe and is a member of the Board of the Barry Amiel and Norman Melburn Trust. She is also a member of the Editorial Board of the new radical left journal, Transform, founded in spring 2017, and linked to the European transform!network, the political foundation of the European Left Party.

Hudson was a member of the Communist Party of Britain until 2011. In 2012, she joined the Respect Party following the party's Bradford West by-election victory. Hudson was selected as the Respect candidate for the 2012 Manchester Central by-election but subsequently stood down in protest at "unacceptable and un-retracted statements about the nature of rape" made by the party's only MP, George Galloway. She resigned as a member of Respect on 15 October 2012.

In March 2013, she joined film director Ken Loach and Gilbert Achcar, Professor of Development Studies at School of Oriental and African Studies (SOAS), University of London, in a call for a new left-wing party. Hudson has written that over 2,000 gave their support to the campaign within three days of its launch. The campaign founded the Left Unity party in November 2013, and Hudson was elected National Secretary of the organisation at its first policy conference on 29 March 2014. Serving as National Secretary for three years, the maximum term allowed, she was elected as the party's Media Officer in March 2017.

Personal life
In the 1990s, Kate Hudson met and married Redmond O'Neill, (1954–2009) an activist in Socialist Action and adviser to Ken Livingstone. In 2012, Hudson married Andrew Burgin, an officer of the Stop the War Coalition and secretary of the national anti-cuts organisation, the Coalition of Resistance. Hudson is also active in the Greece Solidarity Campaign and the Venezuela Solidarity Campaign.

Selected works
CND – Now More Than Ever: The Story of a Peace Movement, Vision Paperbacks,  (2005)
Breaking the South Slav Dream: The Rise and Fall of Yugoslavia, Pluto Press,  (2003)
European Communism Since 1989, Palgrave Macmillan,  (2000)
The New European Left: a socialism for the twenty-first century?, Palgrave Macmillan,  (2012)
Free Movement and Beyond: agenda setting for Brexit Britain (ed), Public Reading Rooms,  (2017)
CND at 60 – Britain's Most Enduring Mass Movement, Public Reading Rooms,  (2018)

See also
List of peace activists

References

External links
Contributor page for The Guardian

1958 births
Living people
Academics of London South Bank University
British communists
British Marxists
British political writers
Campaign for Nuclear Disarmament activists
Place of birth missing (living people)
Communist Party of Britain members
Leaders of political parties in the United Kingdom
Respect Party parliamentary candidates
Academic journal editors